Enrico Blasi (born February 16, 1972) is an American hockey coach, former player and athletics administrator who currently serves as head coach at the University of St. Thomas. Blasi was previously the head coach for the Miami RedHawks men's ice hockey team, a position he occupied from 1999 until his firing in 2019.

Life and career 
Blasi is a native of Weston, Ontario.  He is an alumnus of Miami University and played for the hockey team from 1990–94, playing on Miami's CCHA championship team in 1992–93 and captaining the 1993–94 team. He came to Miami after working four years—three as an assistant and one as a graduate assistant—under his former Miami coach George Gwozdecky, who moved to the University of Denver in 1994. Blasi became head coach of his alma mater in 1999 and, at the time, was the youngest head coach in Division I college hockey. He received the Spencer Penrose Award in 2006 and won four CCHA Coach of the Year Awards in 2000–01, 2003–04, 2005–06, 2009–10. Blasi got his 300th win on January 25, 2013 during a 2–1 victory over CCHA rival Bowling Green.

Blasi is a member of the Advisory Board for You Can Play, a campaign dedicated to fighting homophobia in sports. After serving one year as an associate athletic director for men’s and women’s hockey, at Providence College of Hockey East, Blasi was named the head men's hockey coach at St. Thomas on April 2, 2021 and will guide the school into the Division I era as a member of CCHA.

Head coaching record

References

External links

1972 births
Living people
Miami RedHawks men's ice hockey players
Miami RedHawks men's ice hockey coaches
St. Thomas (Minnesota) Tommies men's ice hockey coaches